George Haddow Rennie (March 10, 1883 – December 13, 1966) was a Canadian lacrosse player who competed in the 1908 Summer Olympics. He was part of the Canadian team which won the gold medal.

Rennie played as a defenseman and turned senior in 1901 with the New Westminster Salmonbellies. He played professional lacrosse with New Westminster from 1909 to 1915 and 1918-1920 - appearing in 120 pro games. He scored 18 goals and had 38 penalties (for 188 penalty minutes) during his professional career.

He was inducted to Canadian Lacrosse Hall of Fame in 1966.

References

External links
Professional Field Lacrosse in British Columbia 1908-1924

1883 births
1966 deaths
Canadian lacrosse players
Olympic lacrosse players of Canada
Lacrosse players at the 1908 Summer Olympics
Olympic gold medalists for Canada
Medalists at the 1908 Summer Olympics
Olympic medalists in lacrosse